Elections were held in Hastings County, Ontario on October 25, 2010, in conjunction with municipal elections across the province.

Hastings County Council

Bancroft

Carlow/Mayo

Centre Hastings

Deseronto

Faraday

Hastings Highlands

Limerick

Madoc

Marmora and Lake

Stirling-Rawdon

Tudor and Cashel

Tweed

Tyendinaga

Wollaston

References 

2010 Ontario municipal elections
Hastings County